Air Marshal John Paul Harvey  (born 4 September 1954) was a senior officer in the Royal Australian Air Force (RAAF) until his retirement at the end of 2011. He held the position of Chief Capability Development Group from October 2010 until December 2011.

Military career

Early career 
Harvey joined the RAAF as a navigator in 1977. After completing navigator training at RAAF Base East Sale he was posted to Canberra bomber aircraft at RAAF Base Amberley.

After four years flying Canberra aircraft, Harvey was appointed as the Minister for Defence's escort officer.

Harvey converted to the F-111 and completed a three-year flying tour on F-111. Following this he was appointed to the Joint Intelligence Organisation in Technical Intelligence where he served for three years. Harvey was then posted to the United States Air Force as the Flight Test Director for the F-111 Avionics Update Project.

Harvey spent a year on exchange with the New Zealand Ministry of Defence before taking up a Visiting Fellow position with the Strategic and Defence Studies Centre at the Australian National University.

After leaving the Australian National University Harvey was appointed the Defence Attaché to Southern Europe.

Senior command 
Harvey was promoted to air commodore and posted as Director General Aerospace Development and on 2 September 2002 he was appointed Director General Air Combat Capability.

In November 2006, Harvey was promoted to air vice marshal and appointed Program Manager New Air Combat Capability within the Defence Materiel Organisation.

In the 2008 Australia Day Honours, Harvey was appointed a Member of the Order of Australia for "exceptional service to the Australian Defence Force and Royal Australian Air Force as the Program Manager, New Air Combat Capability".

In October 2010, following the resignation of Vice Admiral Matt Tripovich, Harvey was promoted to the rank of air marshal and appointed as Chief Capability Development Group.

Retirement 
At the beginning of December 2011, Harvey's position as Chief of the Capability Development Group was made answerable to a new civilian appointee. Harvey objected to the new arrangement, and subsequently tended his resignation from the RAAF; according to the Canberra Times, he "is not going to another position in Defence".

Personal life 
Harvey has degrees in architecture from the University of New South Wales as well as psychology and information science.

Honours and awards

References 

1954 births
Australian aviators
Chiefs of Capability Development Group (Australia)
Living people
Members of the Order of Australia
People from Sydney
Royal Australian Air Force air marshals
Military personnel from New South Wales
University of New South Wales alumni